Gosden is the surname of:

 Andrew Gosden (born 1993), disappeared in London aged 14
 Chris Gosden (born 1955), British archaeologist,    professor of archaeology at Oxford 
 Christine Gosden (born 1939), British swimmer 
 Freeman Gosden (1899–1992), American radio comedian
 John Gosden (born 1951), British racehorse trainer
 Roger Gosden (born 1948), British physiologist concerned with reproductive medicine 
 Towser Gosden (1904–67), British racehorse trainer